Wilfred Makepeace Lunn (born 1942 in Rastrick, West Yorkshire, England) is an English inventor, prop maker and TV presenter. He is best known for his regular appearances on the 1960s and 1970s UK children's television show Vision On.

Early life and career
Lunn was born in Rastrick, West Yorkshire, England to deaf parents. His upbringing was to later allow him to teach lip-reading as well as religious education at Odsal House School for the Deaf in Bradford. In the first part of this self-made interview video series "My Best Cellar", available through his website, Lunn claims he was "brought up in a cellar by deaf mutes".

The parents of actor James Mason lived on the same street as Lunn who met Mason when he was visiting them. Mason introduced Lunn to agent Blanche Marvin. Lunn had already written a television play entitled Benny Rolly which, unusually for the time, was without dialogue and Marvin thought it would be of interest to the deaf. She arranged an interview with Patrick Dowling the producer of BBC's Vision On and Lunn took along some of his models to demonstrate. Dowling was unable to employ Lunn but suggested an exhibition of his cycles. On the opening night of the exhibition, which had been arranged by Marvin, TV presenter Joan Bakewell visited and invited Lunn to appear on Late Night Line-Up that night. This was Lunn's first television appearance.

Lunn was later invited to appear on the children's TV show Magpie on which he spoke on a variety of subjects including bottles and the history of the domestic smoothing iron. Meanwhile Dowling approached Lunn with a request to make a 'door-bell machine'. Lunn constructed the device and appeared with it on Vision On. Lunn would go to appear on the programme for many years, with Tony Hart and Sylvester McCoy, demonstrating his latest inventions. He later appeared in several other series, including Jigsaw and Eureka.

Lunn is a prolific constructor of novelty bicycles and an inventor of strange devices, amongst which was a collection formerly to be found in the Inventions Bar, Newcastle upon Tyne. Lunn has also appeared as an after-dinner speaker for many functions including the Edinburgh School of Architecture Winter School, and the Society of Industrial Artists Golden Jubilee. He has also been a member of the panel of judges for the World Disco Championship.

When asked, in an interview with the b3ta website, "In the event of the end of the world, what would be the last thing you'd do before death?" Lunn answered: "I'm constantly being told at the end I would turn to God. I always point out it was your God that made me an atheist. I have been teetotal for fifteen years, so I would turn to drink."

Television appearances

 Late Night Line-Up
 Magpie 
 Vision On
 Eureka
 Jigsaw
 Ask Aspel
 Patently Obvious
 Object in Question
 Jim'll Fix It
 What's the Idea (writer and presenter)
 Game for a Laugh
 The 6 O'Clock Show
 Home James (James Mason documentary)
 Mad Science
 The Word
 See It Saw It
 3-2-1 (game designer)
 Mooncat - presenter
 Magic Music Man (art director)
 Fun Factory
 Rolf on Saturday, OK!
 Fantastic Facts (with Jonathan Ross)

Stage shows
 Huddersfield Novelty Suicide Company - Disco Queen (pantomime)
 Theatre Museum, Covent Garden (one-man-show)

Books
 Mad Things to Make from 'Vision On''' (1976)
 Cheap, Cheerful and Sometimes Grotty Gifts to Make (1984)
 My Best Cellar: An Autobiography Up to the Age of Eleven... and Other Stuff  (2008),  Shaffron Publishing Ltd , 
 No Animals Were Harmed Making These Christmas Cards (2012)

Awards
 Prix Jeunesse
 BAFTA Harlequin Award for Drama/Light Entertainment (for Jigsaw'')
 Critic's Award
 Ohio State Award

References

External links

Wilf Lunn's web site

BBC -Vision On
British Film Institute - Vision On

See also 
Tim Hunkin

British television presenters
Living people
People educated at Hipperholme Grammar School
People from Brighouse
1942 births
People from Rastrick